The city of Brno is divided into 29 city districts.

Map

Table

Cadastral areas

References

Brno-City District